Leonid Ivanovych Rudnytzky (born September 8, 1935 in Lviv, Ukraine) is a linguist, professor of German, Slavic and Ukrainian Studies, co-editor of numerous American and Ukrainian encyclopedias, and scholar of the National Academy of Sciences of Ukraine.

Biographical information 

Leonid Rudnytzky was the son of Ivan-Theodore Rudnytzky – a lawyer, UGA centurion, November rebellion (Lystopadovyj zryv) co-organizer (1918) and ZUNR military attaché – and Yulia Rudnytzka from the Luzhnytzky family.

During the Second World War, in 1944, the Rudnytzky family moved to Germany.

In 1951, at the age of 16 he lost his father and the following year moved to the United States with his mother.

In 1958, got his undergraduate degree at La Salle College in Philadelphia.

In 1960, earned an MA in Germanic Philology at University of Pennsylvania. And in 1965 he finished and defended his doctoral dissertation "Franko’s translations of German literature" at the Ukrainian Free University in Munich.

In 1959–1960, taught at La Salle College (later University). Having started as an ordinary professor of Germanic and later Slavic Studies and Comparative Literature, he soon became “Habilitatio” Professor. 
In 1988–98 Rudnytzky taught at the University of Pennsylvania in Philadelphia and the Ukrainian Catholic University in Rome. Later, he was chosen to be the Director of the UCU (Ukrainian Catholic University) branch in Philadelphia. At the same time he became the Director of the Central and East European Studies Master’s Program at La Salle University.

In the years 1985–1986 and 1989–1990, he was the Chairman of the International Ivan Franko Society in the U.S.

In the years 1992–2006, he was President of the World Council of the Shevchenko Scientific Society. Rudnytzky held the position of Dean of the Philology Department and was a member of the faculty of the Ukrainian Free University in Munich. Between 1998 and 2004 he was its Rector. He was a member of the Shevchenko Scientific Society for over 40 years.

In 1994, he became a foreign scholar of NANU. (National Academy of Sciences of Ukraine).

In 2004 he became President of the "Saint Sophia" Religious Association of the Ukrainian Catholics in America.

Scholarly work 
Leonid Rudnytzky’s scholarly work is focused on the following fields: the literary studies (Comparative literature, Ukrainian literature), language and translation, history, church, culture, biographical studies, theater studies and ethnological (ethical, moral and psychological-didactic) issues of civil society.

One of the main scientific interests of Rudnytzky is the history of the world’s writing and general literature. According to Rudnytzky’s interpretation, the study of literature is divided into scientific and artistic sections, designed primarily to meet intellectual and aesthetic needs. Especially close to Rudnytzky are the reflections on the nature of Ukrainian literature. He stresses the exceptional character of this literature, especially as a rarity and aesthetic phenomenon.

In regards to German literature, the attention in Rudnytzky’s work is primarily focused on the analysis of the work of the 18th–19th century writers. Rudnytzky is not concerned about going into depth in the works of German writers, but rather its path of influence on Slavic literature and Slavic reality, especially Ukrainian. His literary focus is divided between Ukrainian writers like Ivan Franko, and German writers of the 18th–19th centuries, such as H.-E. Lessing, J.-W. Goethe, G. Kleist, H. Heine, H. Keller, F. Mayer, D. Liliencron and others. Rudnytzky evaluates Ukrainian writers from the perspective of Franko. Rudnytzky indicates the influence of German authors on the work of Franko, and through him to the development of Ukrainian literature.

Among Rudnytzky’s literary interests his academic works related to theater studies and drama should be mentioned. His interest in research began while reviewing plays. His first publication was the article "Mazepa on the American scene."

Another side of academic interest of Rudnytzky is language and linguistics. He promotes the Ukrainian language through the re-edition of dictionaries. In 1992 within the framework of NTSh "The Dictionary of Synonyms of the Ukrainian Language" by A. Bagmet was published.

In the context of his linguistic interest it is worth mentioning his work as a translator. He not only translates from Ukrainian to English, but also vice versa. Not only academic but also literary works are in his field of translation interest. By translating literary works he continues the implementation of Franko’s metaphor of translation as "a bridge of unity between nations." Rudnytzky (together with Y. Tkach) translated "The Cathedral" by Oles’ Honchar.

A large part of Rudnytzky’s academic research concerns historical issues. His field of interest covers ancient and modern world, and especially the contemporary era. He asks the question of the development of history as a subject and the role of the historian in it. He regards history as “the most important humanist science" because it chronologically explores the development of human society.

The issue of historical and cultural studies inevitably arise in Rudnytzky’s interest in the Ukrainian Catholic Church and other churches. It is worth mentioning the report on the status of churches and religions in the USSR which he delivered for the U.S. Congress in 1986.

Another important part of his academic interest is the history of the Ukrainian Catholic Church and lay movement.

Awards 

 Lindback Award for Distinguished Teaching for teaching at La Salle University in Philadelphia (USA – 1966)
 Ivan Franko Literary Prize of the Union of Writers of Ukraine for research in Franko studies (Kyiv, Ukraine – 1993)
 Award of the President of Ukraine for his personal contribution to the development of the Ukrainian state (Kyiv, Ukraine – 1996)
 Basilian Humanitarian Award from the Order of Basilian Sisters (Sestry Vasilianky) (Philadelphia, USA – 1997)
 Order of Yaroslav the Wise – IV degree (Kyiv, Ukraine – 2003)
 Knight of the Order of Malta (USA – 2004)
 Pro Universitate Medal of the Ukrainian Free University (Munich, Germany – 2005)
 Diploma of Laureate and Medal of Myhailo Hrushevsky (Lviv, Ukraine – 2005)

Scholarly works 

 "Mazepa on the American scene", Kyiv (Philadelphia). – 1959.
 "Something about Franko translations of German literature", Scholarly Notes / Ukrainian Technical and Economic Institute. – Munich, 1966. – Vol. XI. – pp. 10–21.
 "The works of Goethe in Franko translations", Scholarly Notes / Ukrainian Technical and Economic Institute. – Munich, 1970. – Vol. XXI. – pp. 75–129.
 «The spirit of Great Freedom» – Thoughts on Oles' Honchar's Novel The Cathedral, Mitteilungen (Munchen), – 1978. – N. 15. – pp. 96–101.
 "The image of Patriarch Josyf Slipyj in literature" Intrepido Pastori ", Rome, 1984.
 "And besides I do not know God" – an attempt to re-interpret (key to the spiritual world of the poet), Today. – 1989. – Paragraph 5. – pp. 33–43.
 "Jevgen Sverstiuk – Christian voice of the secular age", Patriarchat, New York, 1990.
 The Millenium of Christianity in Ukraine, Bulletin St. Sophia Religious Association of the Ukrainian Catholics in the United States. – 1988. pp. 12–18.
 Ukrainian language today and tomorrow, Our Life. New York, 1989. pp. 9–10.
 Dictionary of Synonyms of the Ukrainian language. Volume I: A – L. Andriy Bahmet. Editors: Gregory L. Luzhnytskyy and Rudnytzky. Shevchenko Scientific Society, New York, 465 c.
 Shevchenko Scientific Society in the USA and Western scientific world: Attempt analysis, From NTSh to UFU. International Conference, Presov, Svydnik, June 1991, Materials / Science Academy of Ukraine. – Kyiv, Lviv 1992. – pp. 149–156.
 UFU: 75 years of service in diaspora, Svoboda. – 1996. – pp. 181–198.
 The concept and history of the UCU affiliates, Identity and Mission of the Ukrainian Catholic University. – Lviv, 2003. – pp. 171–179.
 "The Voice of Christian Conscience." Looking East: Quarterly of the Byzantine Center, Fatima, Portugal. Editor: John J. Mowatt.Vol. 7, No. 13. pp. 17–19.
 "Ukrainian Literature," ed. Modern Slavic Literatures. Volume II. Frederick Ungar Publishing Co., New York. pp. 448–532.
 Encyclopedia of World Literature in the 20th Century: Volume 1: A to D. Leonard pp. Klein, General Editor, Leonid Rudnytzky, Consultant for Slavic Literatures. Frederick Ungar Publishing Co., New York. Articles contributed: Leonid Andreev pp. 89–91, Edward Bahrytskiy pp. 177–178, Anton Chekhov pp. 445–451, Ivan Dracz pp. 485–486.
 "The Image of Austria in the Works of Ivan Franko." Nation building and the Politics of Nationalism: Essays on Austrian Galicia. Andrei S. Markovits and Frank E. Sysyn, editors. Distributed by the Harvard University Press for the Harvard Ukrainian Research Institute, Cambridge, Massachusetts. pp. 239–254.
 Encyclopedia of World Literature in the 20th Century: Volume 4: R to Z. Leonard S. Klein, General Editor, Leonid Rudnytzky, Consultant for Slavic Literatures. Frederick Ungar Publishing Co., New York. Articles contributed: Maksym Rylskiy pp. 116–117, Vasyl Stefanyk pp. 327–328, Ohlyad of Ukrainian "Literature" pp. 492–498, Lesya Ukrainka pp. 498–499, Volodymyr Vynnychenko pp. 576–577.
 Literary Exile in the Twentieth Century: An Analysis and Biographical Dictionary. Ed. Martin Tucker. Greenwood Press, New York. articles contributed: Ihor Kachurovskiy pp. 359–360; Yuri Klen pp. 377–378; Evhen Molonyuk pp. 445–446; Shornovskiy p. 655.
 Encyclopedia of World Literature in the 20th Century. Steven R. Serafin, General Editor. Volume 5: Supplement and Index. A Frederick Ungar Book, Continuum, New York. articles contributed: Lina Kostenko pp. 370–371; Michailo Kotsubunskiy pp. 371–372; Mykola Rudenko pp. 524–525; Valeriy Shevchuk pp. 553–554; Vasyl Stus pp. 579–580; Ohlyad Ukrainian Literature pp. 612–615.

Books or book chapters authored or edited by Rudnytzky 
 The Ukrainian Catholic Church: 1945–1975, A Symposium, St. Sophia Religious Association of Ukrainian Catholics, Philadelphia, 1976, 162 pp. (Co-editor).
“Ukrainian Literature” in: Modern Slavic Literatures, Vol. II, pages 448–532, Frederick Ungar Publishing Company, New York, 1976.
Dictionary of Ukrainian Synonyms by A. Bahmet, Shevchenko Scientific Society, New York, 1982, Vol. I, 465 pp. (Co-editor).
Literary Currents after World War II., Shevchenko Scientific Society, New York—Philadelphia 1982, Vol. 195 (Co-editor).
 “Russian, Czech, Hungarian, and Polish Dramatists”, in: Major Modern Dramatists, Frederick Ungar Publishing Company, New York, 1986, vol. II, 370–558 pp.
The Cathedral. A Novel by Oles’ Honchar, Translated, edited, and with an Introduction by L. Rudnytzky. St. Sophia, Philadelphia., 1989, 308 pp.
Jubiläumssammelwerk der Beiträge des Wissenschaftlichen Kongresses zum Millennium des Christentums in der Ukraine, Ukrainian Free University, Munich, 1989, 1002 pp. (Co-editor).
Mykhailo Hrushevs’kyi, Shevchenko Scientific Society, Lviv, 1994, 487 pp. (Co-editor).
A Collection of Essays in Memory of Hryhor Luzhnyts’kyi, Shevchenko Scientific Society, Lviv, 1996, 357 pp. (Co-editor).
Faith and Hope: The Kyivan Church in Union with Rome, 1596–1996, St Sophia Association, Philadelphia, 1997, 144 pp. (An Album published in three separate editions: Ukrainian, English and Polish.)
The Heart as a Living Source. An Anthology of Poetry Dedicated to Patriarch Joseph Slipyj, “Nova Zoria,” Ivano-Frankivsk, Ukraine, 2000, 174 pp. (in Ukrainian, Editor).
Ivan Franko and German Literature Ukrainisches Technisch-Wirtschaftliches Institut, 1974, Munich, 225 pages, (Ukrainian text with German summary). A revised and supplemented second edition was published by the Shevchenko Scientific Society, Lviv, Ukraine, 2002. 238 pp.
German Romantic Thinkers: An Anthology, “Lileya,” Ivano-Frankivsk, Ukraine, 2003, 580 pp. (in Ukrainian, Co-editor).
Ivan Kotljarevs’kyj. Aeneida (A Translation of the Ukrainian Classic into German), Ludwig-Maximilian University and Ukrainian Free University, Munich, 2003, 242 pp. (Co-editor).
“Caroline Newton und George W. Hallgarten: Erinnerungen an Thomas Mann zwischen Bayern und Amerika“ in Thomas Mann in München II, Dirk Heisserer, ed., peniope, Munich, 2004, pp. 107–164
Author of numerous articles on German-Ukrainian literary relations, on the Ukrainian writer Ivan Franko (1856–1916), and on 20th century Ukrainian Church history.

Sources 
 O. Kupchynsky "Leonid Rudnytzky – scientist, teacher, social and cultural worker, "preface to the collection of scientific papers in honor of Leonid Rudnytzky, Lviv Philadelphia, 2008. – pp. 4–34.
 N. Rudnytzky "Materials for a bibliography of works by Leonid Rudnytzky," preface to collection of scientific papers in honor of Leonid Rudnytzky, Lviv, Philadelphia, 2008. – pp. 35–59.
 D. Pavlychko "The Power of disobedience," preface to the collection of scientific papers in honor of Leonid Rudnytzky, Lviv, Philadelphia, 2008. – pp. 63–68
 Penn Language center of the University of Pennsylvania

1935 births
Living people
Ukrainian SSR emigrants to the United States
Linguists from Ukraine
La Salle University faculty
Recipients of the Order of Prince Yaroslav the Wise, 4th class